Keith Hepworth (born c. 1942), also known by the nickname of 'Heppy', is an English former professional rugby league footballer who played in the 1950s, 1960s and 1970s, and coached in the 1980s.

Playing career

Castleford
Hepworth played in Castleford's victory in the Yorkshire County League during the 1964–65 season.

Hepworth played , and scored a goal in Castleford's 7-2 victory over Swinton in the 1966 BBC2 Floodlit Trophy final during the 1966–67 season on Tuesday 20 December 1966, and played  in the 8-5 victory over Leigh in the 1967 BBC2 Floodlit Trophy final during the 1967–68 season on Saturday 16 January 1968.

Hepworth played , and scored a try in Castleford's 11-6 victory over Salford in the 1969 Challenge Cup final during the 1968–69 season on Saturday 17 May 1969, and played , in the 7-2 victory over Wigan in the 1970 Challenge Cup final during the 1969–70 season on Saturday 9 May 1970. Keith Hepworth's collision with Wigan's  Colin Tyrer, left Tyrer with a broken jaw.

Hepworth's Testimonial match at Castleford took place in 1968. He was named as a Castleford Tigers Hall Of Fame Inductee.

Leeds
In October 1971, Leeds signed Hepworth from Castleford for a fee of £4,000.

Hepworth played  in Leeds' 13-16 defeat by St. Helens in the 1972 Challenge Cup Final during the 1971–72 season on Saturday 13 May 1972.

Hepworth played , and was man of the match in Leeds' 12-7 victory over Salford in the 1972–73 Player's No.6 Trophy Final during the 1972–73 season at Fartown Ground, Huddersfield on Saturday 24 March 1973.

Hepworth played  in Leeds' 36-9 victory over Dewsbury in the 1972 Yorkshire Cup final during the 1972–73 season on Saturday 7 October 1972, and played , and was man of the match winning the White Rose Trophy in the 7-2 victory over Wakefield Trinity in the 1973 Yorkshire Cup final during the 1973–74 season on Saturday 20 October 1973.

After losing his first team place to Peter Banner at the start of the 1976–77 season, Hepworth was transfer listed by Leeds, and was eventually sold to Hull.

Hull
Hepworth played  in Hull FC's 13-3 victory over Hull Kingston Rovers in the 1979 BBC2 Floodlit Trophy Final during the 1979-80 season on Tuesday 18 December 1979.

Representative honours
Hepworth won caps for Yorkshire playing  in the 33-10 victory over Lancashire at Hull FC's stadium on 23 September 1964, the 3-19 defeat by Cumberland at Hull Kingston Rovers' stadium on 8 September 1965, the 15-9 victory over New Zealand at Castleford's stadium on 20 September 1965, the 34-23 victory over Cumberland at Castleford's stadium on 25 October 1967, the 12-14 defeat by Lancashire at Salford's stadium on 3 September 1969, and the 34-8 victory over Lancashire at Castleford's stadium on 24 February 1971.

Hepworth represented Commonwealth XIII while at Castleford in 1965 against New Zealand at Crystal Palace National Recreation Centre, London on Wednesday 18 August 1965, and won caps for Great Britain while at Castleford in 1967 against France (2 matches); in 1970 against Australia (3 matches), and New Zealand (2 matches), and in the 1970 Rugby League World Cup against Australia, France, New Zealand, and Australia.

Coaching career
Hepworth coached Bramley between 1980 and 1982, and occasionally made appearances as a player for the club. At the end of the 1981–82 season, his contract was not renewed and the club appointed Maurice Bamford as his replacement.

In 1988 Hepworth was joint team manager of Hull F.C. with Tony Dean (former coach of Wakefield Trinity).

References

External links
!Great Britain Statistics at englandrl.co.uk (statistics currently missing due to not having appeared for both Great Britain, and England)
Photograph "Mumby tackled without the ball - Keith Mumby tackled by John Holmes without the ball - Date: 20/08/1978" at rlhp.co.uk

1940s births
Living people
English rugby league players
Rugby league players from Castleford
Rugby league halfbacks
English rugby league coaches
Castleford Tigers players
Leeds Rhinos players
Hull F.C. players
Yorkshire rugby league team players
Great Britain national rugby league team players
Bramley R.L.F.C. coaches
Hull F.C. coaches